Spencer McNair Richey (born May 30, 1992) is an American professional soccer player who plays as a goalkeeper for Major League Soccer club Chicago Fire.

Career

College and amateur
Richey spent his entire college career at the University of Washington. He made a total of 71 appearances for the Huskies and finished with 30 clean sheets.

He also played in the Premier Development League for Tacoma Tide, Portland Timbers U23s, Washington Crossfire and Puget Sound Gunners.

Professional
On January 20, 2015, Richey was selected in the third round (61st overall) of the 2015 MLS SuperDraft by Vancouver Whitecaps FC.  However he was cut from camp and he ended up joining USL affiliate club Whitecaps FC 2.  He made his professional debut for the club on April 1 in a match against Austin Aztex.

Richey signed with Major League Soccer side Vancouver Whitecaps FC on December 19, 2016.

On November 22, 2017, the Whitecaps picked up Richey's team option and loaned him to FC Cincinnati for the 2018 season.

Richey was released by Vancouver at the end of their 2018 season. His MLS rights were subsequently traded to new MLS expansion side FC Cincinnati in December 2018 in exchange for a third-round selection in the 2020 MLS SuperDraft.

He was released by Cincinnati at the end of their 2020 season.

On February 2, 2021, it was announced that Richey signed with Seattle Sounders FC. Following the 2021 season, Seattle declined their contract option on Richey.

International
Richey was a member of the U.S. under-17 national team at the 2009 FIFA U-17 World Cup.

Career statistics

Club

References

External links
Washington Huskies bio

1992 births
Living people
Soccer players from Seattle
American soccer players
Association football goalkeepers
Washington Huskies men's soccer players
USL Championship players
USL League Two players
Major League Soccer players
Seattle Sounders FC U-23 players
Portland Timbers U23s players
Washington Crossfire players
Puget Sound Gunners FC players
Whitecaps FC 2 players
Vancouver Whitecaps FC players
Vancouver Whitecaps FC draft picks
FC Cincinnati (2016–18) players
FC Cincinnati players
Seattle Sounders FC players
Tacoma Defiance players
Chicago Fire FC players
American expatriate soccer players
American expatriate sportspeople in Canada
Expatriate soccer players in Canada
United States men's youth international soccer players